Samantha Allen (born 17 October 1988) is an English professional wrestler. She is most well known for her time in WWE where she performed on the NXT UK brand under the ring name Nina Samuels.

Professional wrestling career

British Empire Wrestling (2014–2017) 
Samuels began wrestling for British Empire Wrestling (BEW) in 2014. On 19 September at BEW/RCW Britain's Rising 2, Samuels teamed with Kirsty Love in a tag match against to Dragonita and Shanna. She returned at BEW Britain's Rising IV in a match against the reigning champion Leah Owens for the Revolution Championship Wrestling's Women's title. Samuels competed on 3 June at the 2017 International Grand Prix three-way match against Christi Jaynes and Shotzi Blackheart.

Pro-Wrestling: EVE (2017–2018) 
Samuels debuted on 18 February in Pro-Wrestling: EVE at EVE A Day at the Resistance, where she teamed with Meiko Satomura and Shanna in a tag match losing to Emi Sakura, Erin Angel and Nixon Newell. She won the Wildcard Ladder Match at the 1st Wrestle Queendom in 2018, and cashed in her contract during a match between Charlie Morgan and Kay Lee Ray, pinning Morgan to win the Pro-Wrestling: Eve Championship.

WWE

NXT UK (2018–2022) 
On 25 August 2018, Samuels competed in the NXT UK Women's Championship Tournament First Round where she was defeated by Dakota Kai. On 23 January 2019, Samuels faced Lana Austin where Samuels was victorious. Samuels faced Toni Storm for the WWE NXT UK's Women's Championship on 19 April. She competed in the 12 person WWE NXT UK Women's Title #1 Contendership Battle Royal on 14 June where Kay Lee Ray was victorious. On 12 November 2020, Samuels went up against Xia Brookside. In the match, Samuels attempted to fake a knee injury but this backfired when Brookside rolled her up for the quick win. After the match, however, Samuels still gained the upper hand by assaulting Brookside at ringside. The feud between Samuels and Brookside would continue week on week. Notably, Samuels cost Brookside a match against Isla Dawn on 10 December 2020. Eventually, the two faced again on 4 February 2021 episode of NXT UK, where Samuels was victorious after hitting Brookside with her handbag. Brookside demanded a rematch where the loser becomes the winner's personal assistant for a whole month. And on 25 February, Brookside defeated Samuels in that match. Throughout March, Samuels would be forced to work as Brookside's assistant.

On 18 August 2022, Samuels was released from her WWE contract.

Championships and accomplishments 
 Pro-Wrestling: EVE
 Pro-Wrestling: EVE Championship (1 time)
 Pro Wrestling Illustrated
 Ranked No. 90 of the top 100 female singles wrestlers in the PWI Women's 100 in 2020
 Lucha Britannia
 Lucha Britannia World Championship (4 times)

References

External links 
 
 
 
 

1988 births
Living people
English female professional wrestlers
Sportspeople from London
21st-century professional wrestlers